Woodbury is the county seat of Gloucester County in the U.S. state of New Jersey. It is part of the South Jersey region of the state. As of the 2020 United States census, the city's population was 9,963, a decrease of 211 (−2.1%) from the 2010 census count of 10,174, which in turn reflected a decline of 133 (−1.3%) from the 10,307 in the 2000 census.

Woodbury was originally formed as a borough on March 27, 1854, within Deptford Township based on the results of a March 22, 1854, referendum. On January 2, 1871, Woodbury was reincorporated as a city based on the results of a referendum held that day.

Inspira Health Network is based in Woodbury. The now-defunct Woodbury Country Club operated in Woodbury from 1897 to 2010, closing due to declining membership and mounting debt that led to its 2013 bankruptcy filing.

The city had the 14th-highest property tax rate in New Jersey with an equalized rate of 4.582% as of 2020 compared to 3.212% in the county as a whole and a statewide average of 2.279%.

History
As recounted by historian William McMahon, the Native Americans called the place where the city of Woodbury is now located "Piscozackasing", or "place of the black burrs".

Woodbury was founded in 1683 by Henry Wood, a Quaker from North West England who left Great Britain due to religious persecution. Wood was incarcerated in Lancaster for practicing as a Quaker and left his home in Tottington near Bury, Lancashire in a boat to set up a community in the new world where he and his family could practice his religion freely. His surname and hometown inspired naming the city that he founded Woodbury.

In 2000, Bury, England, and Woodbury were twinned as part of millennium celebrations in both countries. The twinning ceremony was the culmination of a week where more than 300 school children and college students, local dignitaries, and local residents from Bury took part in sporting and cultural events held in and around Woodbury. During the week, there was a symbolic meeting and reconciliation of the Vicar of Henry Wood's former church in Tottington and the Quaker meeting house in Woodbury and an ecumenical service attended by many of the residents and visitors.

Paleontological discovery
In 1787, a fossil bone recovered in Woodbury from local Cretaceous strata was discussed by the American Philosophical Society in Philadelphia. The remains were only retrospectively identified as dinosaurian, as dinosaurs would not be scientifically recognized as a distinct group of reptiles until August of 1841.

Recycling
Woodbury was the first city in the United States to mandate recycling. This effort was led by then-councilman and later mayor Donald P. Sanderson in the 1970s, and an ordinance was finally passed in December 1980. The idea of towing a recycling trailer behind a trash collection vehicle to enable the collection of trash and recyclable material at the same time emerged. Sanderson was asked to speak in municipalities throughout the country and other towns and cities soon followed suit.

Historic district
There are numerous contributing properties to the Broad Street Historic District encompassing Broad Street (located between Woodbury Creek and Courtland Street) Highland Mills,and Delaware Street (located between Broad and Wood streets) including the Gloucester County Courthouse, which was placed on the New Jersey Register of Historic Places (#1429) in 1988.

Geography
According to the U.S. Census Bureau, the city had a total area of 2.10 square miles (5.45 km2), including 2.02 square miles (5.23 km2) of land and 0.08 square miles (0.22 km2) of water (3.95%).

The city borders Deptford Township, West Deptford Township, and Woodbury Heights.

Climate
Woodbury has a humid subtropical climate (Köppen climate classification Cfa) typical of New Jersey with warm summers and cold winters.

Demographics

2010 census

The Census Bureau's 2006–2010 American Community Survey showed that (in 2010 inflation-adjusted dollars) median household income was $58,629 (with a margin of error of +/− $4,598) and the median family income was $74,276 (+/− $7,880). Males had a median income of $57,019 (+/− $3,425) versus $37,363 (+/− $6,910) for females. The per capita income for the borough was $28,845 (+/− $2,571). About 7.8% of families and 11.4% of the population were below the poverty line, including 15.7% of those under age 18 and 15.0% of those age 65 or over.

2000 census
As of the 2000 United States census, there were 10,307 people, 4,051 households, and 2,588 families residing in the city. The racial makeup of the city was 72.45% White, 22.83% African American, 0.22% Native American, 0.99% Asian, 0.14% Pacific Islander, 1.28% from other races, and 2.10% from two or more races. Hispanic or Latino of any race were 3.94% of the population.

There were 4,051 households, out of which 32.3% had children under the age of 18 living with them, 41.4% were married couples living together, 18.5% had a female householder with no husband present, and 36.1% were non-families. 31.7% of all households were made up of individuals, and 15.4% had someone living alone who was 65 years of age or older. The average household size was 2.43 and the average family size was 3.08.

In the city, the population was spread out, with 24.8% under the age of 18, 8.5% from 18 to 24, 29.8% from 25 to 44, 20.4% from 45 to 64, and 16.5% who were 65 years of age or older. The median age was 37 years. For every 100 females, there were 87.7 males. For every 100 females age 18 and over, there were 82.7 males.

The median income for a household in the city was $41,827 and the median income for a family was $53,630. Males had a median income of $40,429 versus $30,570 for females. The per capita income for the city was $21,592. About 11.2% of families and 13.5% of the population were below the poverty line, including 17.7% of those under age 18 and 15.4% of those age 65 or over.

Government

Local government
Woodbury is governed under the City form of New Jersey municipal government, which is used in 15 municipalities (of the 564) statewide. The governing body is comprised of the Mayor and the City Council. A Mayor is elected at-large directly by the voters for a two-year term of office. The City Council is comprised of nine members, three from each of three wards, elected to serve three-year terms on a staggered basis, with one seat from each ward coming up for election each year as part of the November general election in a three-year cycle.

, the Mayor of Woodbury is Democrat Peg Sickel, whose term ends December 31, 2022. Members of the Woodbury City Council are Council President Philip Haggerty (D, 2024; Ward 3), Danielle Carter (D, 2022; Ward 1), William H. Fleming Jr. (D, 2024; Ward 2), Frances Harwell (D, 2023; Ward 2), Reed Merinuk (D, 2022; Ward 3), Donna Miller (D, 2023; Ward 1), Kyle Miller (D, 2023; Ward 3), Karlene O'Connor (D, 2022; Ward 2) and Thomas Pisarcik (D, 2024; Ward 1).

In April 2017, the City Council selected Karlene O'Connor from a list of three candidates nominated by the Democratic municipal committee to fill the Second Ward seat expiring in December 2019 that had been held by David Trovato until he resigned from office earlier in the month.

At the January 2017 reorganization meeting, the City Council chose Kenneth McIlvaine from three candidates nominated by the Democratic municipal committee to fill the Third Ward seat expiring in December 2017 that was vacated by Jessica Floyd when she took office as mayor.

The Democratic sweep in November 2012 of the three council seats and mayor gave the party a 6–3 majority on the 2013 council.

Federal, state and county representation 
Woodbury is located in the 1st Congressional District and is part of New Jersey's 5th state legislative district.

Politics
As of March 2011, there were a total of 6,368 registered voters in Woodbury, of which 2,255 (35.4%) were registered as Democrats, 1,162 (18.2%) were registered as Republicans and 2,948 (46.3%) were registered as Unaffiliated. There were 3 voters registered as Libertarians or Greens.

In the 2012 presidential election, Democrat Barack Obama received 67.7% of the vote (2,972 cast), ahead of Republican Mitt Romney with 30.9% (1,356 votes), and other candidates with 1.5% (65 votes), among the 4,430 ballots cast by the city's 6,623 registered voters (37 ballots were spoiled), for a turnout of 66.9%. In the 2008 presidential election, Democrat Barack Obama received 66.9% of the vote (3,216 cast), ahead of Republican John McCain with 30.9% (1,487 votes) and other candidates with 1.2% (58 votes), among the 4,806 ballots cast by the city's 6,829 registered voters, for a turnout of 70.4%. In the 2004 presidential election, Democrat John Kerry received 60.1% of the vote (2,735 ballots cast), outpolling Republican George W. Bush with 38.3% (1,742 votes) and other candidates with 0.7% (43 votes), among the 4,547 ballots cast by the city's 6,521 registered voters, for a turnout percentage of 69.7.

In the 2013 gubernatorial election, Republican Chris Christie received 58.6% of the vote (1,499 cast), ahead of Democrat Barbara Buono with 39.4% (1,007 votes), and other candidates with 2.0% (51 votes), among the 2,608 ballots cast by the city's 6,370 registered voters (51 ballots were spoiled), for a turnout of 40.9%. In the 2009 gubernatorial election, Democrat Jon Corzine received 51.8% of the vote (1,416 ballots cast), ahead of Republican Chris Christie with 36.4% (995 votes), Independent Chris Daggett with 8.5% (232 votes) and other candidates with 1.2% (34 votes), among the 2,732 ballots cast by the city's 6,649 registered voters, yielding a 41.1% turnout.

Education
Woodbury Public Schools serve students in pre-kindergarten through twelfth grade. As of the 2018–19 school year, the district is comprised of four schools and had an enrollment of 1,550 students and 129.2 classroom teachers (on an FTE basis) for a student–teacher ratio of 12.0:1. Schools in the district (with 2018–19 enrollment data from the National Center for Education Statistics) are 
Evergreen Avenue Elementary School with 291 students in grades Pre-K–5, 
Walnut Street Elementary School with 117 students in grades Pre-K–5, 
West End Memorial Elementary School with 435 students in grades K–5 and 
Woodbury Junior-Senior High School with 680 students in grades 6–12.

Students from across Gloucester County are eligible to apply to attend Gloucester County Institute of Technology, a four-year high school in Deptford Township that provides technical and vocational education. As a public school, students do not pay tuition to attend the school.

Holy Angels Catholic School is a Catholic school serving students in PreK–8, operated by the Roman Catholic Diocese of Camden and located in the building built originally as St. Patrick's School in 1944. It was established in 2017 by the Bishop of Camden as the successor to Holy Trinity Regional School, which was created as part of the 2007 merger of the parish catholic schools of St. Patrick's, St. Matthew's of National Park and Most Holy Redeemer of Westville Grove.

Transportation

Roads and highways

Several roadways pass through the city. Route 45, also known as Mantua Avenue and Broad Street at various points, enters the city at its southernmost point from West Deptford Township and proceeds for  before heading along the Deptford Township/West Deptford Township border at the north end of the city. County Route 551 (Salem Avenue) enters from West Deptford Township in the southwest and proceeds for  before beginning a concurrency with Route 45.

Public transportation
NJ Transit bus service between the city and Philadelphia is available on the 401 (from Salem), 402 (from Pennsville Township), 410 (from Bridgeton), and 412 (from Sewell) routes, and local service is offered on the 455 (Cherry Hill to Paulsboro) and 463 (between Woodbury and the Avandale Park/Ride in Winslow Township) routes.

Beginning in the 1860s and ending in 1971, passenger train service was provided by the Camden and Woodbury Railroad, West Jersey Railroad, West Jersey & Seashore Railroad, and the Pennsylvania-Reading Seashore Lines. Woodbury station was built in 1883 and renovated in 2000.

Two stops, at Red Bank Avenue and Woodbury station, on the proposed Glassboro–Camden Line, an  diesel multiple unit (DMU) light rail system, are planned. Originally projected for completion in 2019, the line has since been delayed until at least 2025.

Notable people

People who were born in, residents of, or otherwise closely associated with Woodbury include:
 Clifford Addams (1876–1942), former painter and etcher
 Ken Albers (1924–2007), singer with the Four Freshmen
 Don Amendolia (born 1945), actor
 Anthony Averett (born 1994), professional football player, Las Vegas Raiders
 John Boyd Avis (1875–1944), former U.S. federal judge
 Eli Ayers (1778–1822), former physician and the first colonial agent of the American Colonization Society in what would later become Liberia<ref>Wroblewski, Joseph. [https://gardenstatelegacy.com/files/He_Was_Above_All_a_Jerseyman_Commodore_Robert_F_Stockton__GSL48.pdf#page=13 "'He Was Above All a Jerseyman'; Commodore Robert Field Stockton], Garden State Legacy. Accessed January 17, 2023. "A fellow New Jerseyman Dr. Eli Ayers, from Woodbury, NJ, accompanied Stockton as an agent of the American Colonization Society."</ref>
 George Benjamin Jr. (1919–1944), U.S. Army soldier and a posthumous recipient of the U.S. military's highest decoration, the Medal of Honor, for his actions during the Philippines campaign of World War II
 J. S. G. Boggs (1955–2017), former artist best known for his hand-drawn depictions of banknotes
 Carroll William "Boardwalk" Brown (1889–1977), a Major League Baseball pitcher for the Philadelphia Athletics
 Roscoe Lee Browne (1922–2007), character actor and former athlete
 Dave Budd (born 1938), former NBA player for the New York Knicks who was one of the three centers for the Knicks assigned to guard Wilt Chamberlain in the game in which he scored 100 points vs. 13 points for Budd
 King Kong Bundy (1957–2019), former WWE wrestler
 Dave Calloway (born 1968), former men's basketball head coach, Monmouth University
 Kyle Cassidy (born 1966), professional photographer
 Joe Colone (1926–2009), former professional basketball player, New York KnicksDatabase Basketball: Joe Colone . Accessed April 14, 2008.
John Cooper (1729–1785), member of the Provincial Congress of New Jersey in 1775 and 1776 who served on the committee that drafted New Jersey's first constitution
Mike Cox (born 1985), former professional football player, Atlanta Falcons and Kansas City Chiefs
Daniel Dalton (born 1949), politician who served as New Jersey Senate Majority Leader and as Secretary of State of New Jersey
Franklin Davenport (1755–1832), Benjamin Franklin's nephew and a Federalist Party U.S. Senator
Donald J. Farish (born 1942), former president of Rowan University in Glassboro
Joe Fields (born 1953), former professional football player, New York Giants and New York Jets
 Oscar Fraley (1914–1994), co-author, with Eliot Ness, of The Untouchables which sold 1.5 million copies
 Samuel Gibbs French (1818-1910), Confederate Major General whose summer home in Woodbury was stormed after residents found out about his service for the South
 Craig Goess (born 1981), former NASCAR and ARCA Menards Series race car driver
 George Gill Green (1842–1925), a patent medicine entrepreneur and American Civil War colonel
 Grace Helbig (born 1985), comedian, actress, author, and creator and host of the web series It's Grace Robert C. Hendrickson (1898–1964), former United States Senator from New Jersey
 Donald F. Holmes (1910–1980), inventor
 Nelson Jones (born 1964), professional football player for the San Diego Chargers
 John Joseph Kitchen (1911–1973), former U.S. federal judge
 George Knapp (born 1952), investigative journalist
 Tom Kovach (born 1969), American attorney and former politician who served in the Delaware House of Representatives
 George F. Kugler Jr. (1925–2004), lawyer who served as New Jersey Attorney Generalref>Holmes, Kristin E. 'George Kugler Jr., former N.J. attorney general", The Philadelphia Inquirer, August 4, 2004. Accessed November 12, 2013. "Born in Woodbury, Mr. Kugler graduated from the Peddie School in Hightstown, N.J., in 1943."</ref>
 David Laganella (born 1974), composer
 Jonathan V. Last (born 1974), The Weekly Standard columnist
 James Lawrence (1781–1813), who coined the phrase "Don't give up the ship" during the War of 1812
 Mike McBath (born 1946), former defensive end for the Buffalo Bills and part-owner of the Orlando Predators
 Bryant McKinnie (born 1979), former professional football player for the Baltimore Ravens
 Dan Meyer (born 1981), former professional baseball player who played for the Atlanta Braves, Florida Marlins, and Oakland Athletics
 Dave Miller (born 1966), former bullpen coach for the Cleveland Indians of Major League Baseball
 Tyler Miller (born 1993), professional soccer player
 J. Hampton Moore (1864–1950), former Congressman and Mayor of Philadelphia (1920–1924; 1932–1936)
 Tim O'Shea (born 1962), men's basketball head coach of the Bryant Bulldogs
 Paul Owens (1924–2003), manager of the 1983 National League Pennant-winning Philadelphia Phillies
 Francis F. Patterson Jr. (1867–1935), represented New Jersey's 1st congressional district in the United States House of Representatives from 1920 to 1927
 Jack Pierce (born 1962), Olympic bronze medalist in the 100-meter high hurdles at the 1992 Olympic Games
 Chris Pressley (born 1986), former fullback for the Cincinnati Bengals
 John Chandler Rafferty (1816–1880), politician
 Ronny J (born 1992), record producer, rapper, and singer
 H. Browning Ross (1924–1998), Olympian in long-distance running (1948) and gold medal winner in the 1,500-meter at the 1951 Pan American Games
 Patti Smith (born 1946), singer-songwriterDeLuca, Dan. "Woodbury's Patti Smith Takes Charge In Camden" , The Philadelphia Inquirer, September 30, 1997. Accessed November 4, 2015. "It was an informal evening in which the punk-rock godmother and Woodbury native cracked jokes, recalled her first apartment in Pitman ('I had water beetles so big they scared the mice') and mixed selections from Peace (Arista **1/2) with older tunes and readings from her poetry collection Early Work."
 Heather Spytek (born 1977), June 2001 Playboy Magazine'' Playmate of the Month
 Dennis Joseph Sullivan (born 1945), Roman Catholic Diocese of Camden bishop
 Al Szolack (born 1950), former member of the Washington Generals traveling basketball team
 D. K. Ulrich (born 1944), former NASCAR driver and owner
 David Ogden Watkins (1862–1938), former acting Governor of New Jersey and mayor of Woodbury from 1886 to 1890
 Ann Cooper Whitall (1716–1797), a Quaker woman known for her actions at the Battle of Red Bank
 John M. Whitall (1800–1877), sea captain, businessman, and philanthropist
 John L. White (1930–2001), former politician who served in the New Jersey General Assembly and in the New Jersey Senate
 Raymond Zane (born 1939), former politician who served in the New Jersey Senate, where he represented the 3rd Legislative District

References

External links

Official Woodbury website

 
1854 establishments in New Jersey
Cities in Gloucester County, New Jersey
City form of New Jersey government
County seats in New Jersey
Populated places established in 1854